Nevşehir Province (from the Persian compound نو شهر Now-shahr meaning "new city") is a province in central Turkey with its capital in Nevşehir. Its adjacent provinces are Kırşehir to the northwest, Aksaray to the southwest, Niğde to the south, Kayseri to the southeast, and Yozgat to the northeast. Nevşehir includes the area called Cappadocia - a tourist attraction in Turkey.  The town of Göreme is also located in Nevşehir.

Cappadocia once included the area now covered by this province. This province is notable for the fairy chimneys of Göreme, the Ortahisar (middle fortress), a number of old churches from the Byzantine period.

History

Archaeology 
An approximately 5,000-year-old three-story underground town which referred as “Gir-Gör” (Enter and See) by locals was revealed in Avanos in 2019. The five-kilometer-long city consisted of three floors, homes, tunnels, places of worship and a small human figurine. According to the locals, the site was considered a source of "healing water” and “Caesar’s bath.”

Sports 
A multiday track running ultramarathon of desert concept, called Runfire Cappadocia Ultramarathon, is held since 2012 annually in July. The race tours  in six days through several historic places across Cappadocia reaching out to Lake Tuz.

Districts

Nevşehir province is divided into 8 districts (capital district in bold):
Acıgöl
Avanos
Derinkuyu
Gülşehir
Hacıbektaş
Kozaklı
Nevşehir
Ürgüp

Places of Interest
 Göreme Open Air Museum
 Uçhisar Castle
 Göreme Historical National Park
 Uç Güzeller, "The Three Beauties" fairy chimneys in Ürgüp
 Love Valley
 Zelve Open Air Museum
 Red and Rose Valley
 Ortahisar Castle
 Mustafapaşa
 Meryem Ana Kilisesi, Mother Mary Church near Nevşehir Castle
 the Hagios Georgios Church, also known as the 'Çanlı Church' near Nevşehir Castle
 Avanos, known for its clay pottery.
 St. John the Baptist Chapel
 Aynalı (Fırkatan) Church
 Açık Saray Museum
 Derinkuyu Underground City
 Kaymakli Underground City
 Tatlarin Underground City
 Haji Bektash Veli Complex

Climate 
Nevşehir has a continental climate (Köppen climate classification: Dsa, Trewartha climate classification: Dc), with cold, snowy winters and warm, dry summers. Precipitation occurs throughout the year, with a slight peak in spring.

See also
 List of municipalities in Nevşehir Province
 Nevşehir Kapadokya Airport

Gallery

References

External links

  Nevşehir governor's official website
  Nevşehir municipality's official website
  Nevşehir weather forecast information

Nevşehir Province